Me Not Me is the second solo studio album by keyboardist Marco Benevento of Brooklyn, New York, released in 2009. It consists mostly of covers—hence the title—along with three original tracks.

Track listing
 "Golden" (My Morning Jacket)
 "Now They're Writing Music" (Benevento)
 "Seems So Long Ago, Nancy" (Leonard Cohen)
 "Mephisto" (Benevento)
 "Twin Killers" (Deerhoof)
 "Call Home" (Benevento)
 "Heartbeats" (The Knife)
 "Sing it Again" (Beck)
 "Friends" (Led Zeppelin)
 "Run of the Mill" (George Harrison)

Personnel
Marco Benevento: piano, optigan, mellotron, tack piano, clavinet
Reed Mathis: bass
Matt Chamberlain: drums [1,2,4,9,10]
Andrew Barr: drums [2,3,5,6,7]

References

Marco Benevento albums
2009 albums